
Gmina Jarocin is an urban-rural gmina (administrative district) in Jarocin County, Greater Poland Voivodeship, in west-central Poland.

Villages
Apart from the town of Jarocin, Gmina Jarocin contains the villages and settlements of Annapol, Bachorzew, Cielcza, Ciświca, Cząszczew, Dąbrowa, Golina, Hilarów, Kadziak, Kąty, Łuszczanów, Mieszków, Osiek, Potarzyca, Prusy, Radlin, Roszków, Roszkówko, Siedlemin, Stefanów, Tarce, Wilczyniec, Wilkowyja, Witaszyce, Witaszyczki and Zakrzew.

Neighbouring gminas
Gmina Jarocin is bordered by the gminas of Dobrzyca, Jaraczewo, Kotlin, Koźmin Wielkopolski, Nowe Miasto nad Wartą and Żerków.

References
Polish official population figures 2006

Jarocin
Gmina Jarocin